Anna Schepeler-Lette (née Anna Lette; December 19, 1829 –  September 17, 1897) was a German feminist, women's social reformer, and pedagogue. She founded schools that had no precedent at the time. She was the first director of Lette-Verein (Lette Society), a German educational institution for girls.

Biography 

Schepeler-Lette was born December 19, 1829, at Soldin, Germany (now Poland). She was the eldest daughter of Dr. Wilhelm Adolf Lette whom she accompanied, in 1848, to Frankfurt am Main, where he went as a member of the German National Parliament. In 1866, she joined her father in Berlin, and was initiated into the work of the Lette Society, to which she devoted all her time and energy. A reformer, Schepeler-Lette went to America in 1876, and visited the Centennial Exposition, and many of the principal cities of the US, where she carefully examined various institutions whose aims were similar to those of the Lette Society.

In 1872, Schepeler-Lette established the "Association to promote the employment of the female sex" in Berlin, later renamed Lette-Verein. Under her leadership, the association became a global model for women's vocational training. She founded schools that had no precedent at the time, nor was there a guarantee that government or industry would find the education provided as being acceptable. Under her leadership, the trade and vocational school was established in 1872, telegraph training in 1873, typesetting in 1875, and photography in 1890. Schepeler-Lette is also remembered for recognizing the need to train and retrain instructors.

Death and legacy
After her death in Berlin, September 17, 1897, the artist Alexander Tondeur created a bust in her honor.

Selected works 
 "Bericht über den Verband deutscher Frauenbildungs- und Erwerbvereine erstattet auf der Generalversammlung des Allgemeinen Deutschen Frauenvereins zu Heidelberg." In Frauenanwalt. Berlin, 1879, pp. 340–345 (in German)
 "Die Spitzenfabrikation des Riesengebirges." In Deutscher Frauenanwalt. Berlin, 1881,  pp. 1–4 (in German)

References

Attribution

Bibliography

1829 births
1897 deaths
Heads of educational institutions
People from Myślibórz
Women academic administrators
German feminists
German social reformers
German women academics
German academic administrators
19th-century German women writers
German founders
School founders
Women founders